Dzogchen Beara is a Tibetan Buddhist retreat centre on the Beara Peninsula near Allihies in West Cork in Ireland established by Sogyal Rinpoche in 1987. It is home to the Spiritual Care Centre, which was opened by Mary McAleese on 12 September 2007.

History
Peter and Harriet Cornish bought the land where Dzogchen Beara is located in 1973. In 1992, they offered the land and its buildings to a charitable trust under the guidance of Sogyal Rinpoche. Harriet died in 1993 and her death, and the way she was cared for, became the inspiration for the Spiritual Care Centre, which opened in 2007. Peter Cornish and Dzogchen Beara were the subject of a documentary made for Dutch television called The Retiring Hermit. Cornish's memoir describing the creation of Dzogchen Beara was published in 2014 under the title Dazzled by Daylight.

In 2006 the centre became the first Buddhist centre in Ireland to host a Christian Mass, performed by Father Laurence Freeman.

In 2017 following multiple allegations of physical, emotional and sexual abuse from current and ex-members of Rigpa, Sogyal Rinpoche "decided, with immediate effect, to retire as spiritual director from all the organizations that bear the name of Rigpa in different countries around the world".

Events
The first closed one-year retreats, which follow a traditional Tibetan schedule of practice and study, began in 1994. 

Over the years, Dzogchen Beara has hosted a number of senior lamas from the Tibetan tradition, including Dzogchen Rinpoche, Dzigar Kongtrul Rinpoche, Garchen Rinpoche, Orgyen Tobgyal, Ringu Tulku, H.E Jetsun Khandro Rinpoche and Garje Khamtrul Rinpoche. It has also hosted events with several non-Tibetan teachers, including Father Laurence Freeman, Sister Stanislaus Kennedy, Dr Tony Bates, Christine Longaker, Patrick Gaffney, Sharon Salzberg and Andrew Warr.

Care centre
The Spiritual Care Centre opened in 2007. According to Darci Meyers, its aim is "to support people leading up to death, at the time of death, and after death."

Temple project
There are plans to build Ireland's first Buddhist temple on the site. The project is being guided by Orgyen Tobgyal, who consecrated the site by performing a fire ceremony in 2010. Work on the foundations of the temple building began in April 2016 and the block work of the three level building has recently been completed.

References

External links
Official website
Official website for Dazzled by Daylight Book
Dechen Shying website
The Retiring Hermit film

Buddhism in Ireland
Tourist attractions in County Cork